Cornsilk is a historic house in Cross Plains, Tennessee, U.S.. It was built circa 1850 for Thomas Stringer. In the 1930s, it was acquired by author Andrew Nelson Lytle, who renamed it "for his ancestral home in Alabama."

The house was designed in the Tennessee Vernacular architectural style.  It has been listed on the National Register of Historic Places since January 11, 1974.

References

Houses on the National Register of Historic Places in Tennessee
Houses completed in 1850
Vernacular architecture in Tennessee
National Register of Historic Places in Robertson County, Tennessee